Darko Vujačić (born 8 February 1978) is a Montenegrin professional basketball coach and former player who is the head coach for Sutjeska of the Prva A Liga and the ABA League Second Division.

Playing career 
During his playing days a shooting guard, Vujačić played for Sutjeska, Lovćen, Mornar, Peja, Leotar, Radnicki Novi Sad, Marso NYKK, CSU Pitești, Energia Rovinari, and Ulcinj. Vujačić retired as a player with Ulcinj in 2014.

Coaching career 
Following his retirement as a player in 2014, Ulcinj hired Vujačić as their new assistant coach. In 2015, he had briefly coached Albanian team Vllaznia prior he returned to Ulcinj as an assistant coach for the 2015–16 season. In 2016, Vujačić got promoted to head coach for Ulcinj. Afterwards, he had stints with Vllaznia and Goga Basket.

On 21 March 2022, Sutjeska hired Vujačić as their new head coach for the rest of the 2021–22 season. On 21 July 2022, he signed a one-year contract extension with Sutjeska.

Career achievements 
As player
 Montenegrin Cup winner: 1 (with Sutjeska: 2013)
 Romanian Cup winner: 1 (with CSU Pitești: 2012)

As head coach
 Albanian Basketball Superleague champion: 1 (with Vllaznia: 2014–15)

References

External links
 Coach Profile at eurobasket.com
 Darko Vujacic at proballers.com
 Darko Vujacic at realgm.com
 Player Profile at eurobasket.com
 Coach Profile at aba-liga.com

1979 births
Living people
CSU Pitești players
CS Energia Rovinari players
KB Peja players
KK Leotar players
KK Lovćen players
KK Mornar Bar players
KK Radnički Novi Sad players
KK Sutjeska coaches
KK Sutjeska players
Montenegrin expatriate basketball people in Kosovo
Montenegrin expatriate basketball people in Hungary
Montenegrin expatriate basketball people in Romania
Montenegrin expatriate basketball people in Serbia
Montenegrin basketball coaches
Montenegrin men's basketball players
Shooting guards
Sportspeople from Nikšić